David Anthony Bowdell Buggé (born 12 December 1956) is an English banker and former first-class cricketer.

Buggé was born in the Colony of Aden in December 1956. He was educated in England at Cranleigh School, before going up to Oriel College, Oxford. While studying at Oxford, he made a single appearance in first-class cricket for Oxford University against Gloucestershire at Oxford in 1977. After graduating from Oxford, Buggé became a banker. He  worked in a number of senior positions within the banking industry, including with Deutsche Bank and Citigroup, which he joined in 2011 as the managing director in the European leveraged finance business.

References

External links

1956 births
Living people
People from Aden
People educated at Cranleigh School
Alumni of Oriel College, Oxford
English cricketers
Oxford University cricketers
English bankers
Deutsche Bank people
Citigroup people